Inallu (also Romanized as Īnāllū; also known as Īnānlū and Dānīānlī) is a village in Rezaqoli-ye Qeshlaq Rural District, in the Central District of Nir County, Ardabil Province, Iran. At the 2006 census, its population was 208, in 47 families.

References 

Towns and villages in Nir County